QMP may refer to:
 Qualitätswein mit Prädikat, a former German wine classification
 Queen mandibular pheromone in honey bees
 Queen Mary Park, Edmonton, Alberta, Canada
 Quintessential Player, a freeware media player